Klaus Rinke (born 29 April 1939) is a German contemporary artist.

Life and work 
Born in Wattenscheid, Rinke trained as a decorative artist and poster painter in Gelsenkirchen from 1954 to 1957. After studying painting from 1957 to 1960 at the Folkwang University of the Arts in Essen, he maintained various studios in Paris and Reims from 1960 to 1964. In 1962, he had his first solo exhibition at the Le Portulan Gallery in Le Havre, France.

In 1965, he returned to Düsseldorf and gave up painting to devote himself to his first water works ("12 barrels of scooped Rhine water", 1969) and first "primary demonstrations". He began an active international exhibition career. From 1970 to 1976, he organised performances and joint exhibitions with Monika Baumgartl.

From 1974 to 2004, Rinke was professor of sculpture at the Kunstakademie Düsseldorf. In 1980, he founded a 'centre for contemplation' in Haan and has had a studio and an apartment in Los Angeles since 1981. Rinke was chairman of the Malkasten artists' association from 1993 to 1998, and has been an honorary member since 1998. In 2007, Rinke moved from Haan near Düsseldorf, where he had lived and worked for almost 30 years, to Neufelden in Austria.

Exhibitions 
Source:

 1969: Galerie Konrad Fischer, Düsseldorf
 1972: Klaus Rinke. Der Versuch meine Arbeiten zu erklären, Kunsthalle Tübingen
 1972: Biennale di Venezia, Venice
 1972: documenta 5, Kassel
 1973: Museum of Modern Art (MoMA)
 1975: Museum Wiesbaden
 1976: Museum Wiesbaden
 1977: Biennale di Venezia, Venice
 1977: documenta 6, Kassel
 1985: Instrumentarium, Centre Georges-Pompidou, Paris
 1992: Kunsthalle Düsseldorf
 2006: Hagia Sophia Museum, Istanbul (Solo exhibition)
 2011: Städel, Frankfurt
 2016: The memories belong to me, Thomas Brambilla Gallery, Bergamo, Italy
 2017: Solo Show, Art Basel Unlimited, Basel, Switzerland
 2017: Derzeit, Wuppertal
 2017: Instrumentarium, The Nave, CCCOD Tours, France
 2019: Die vierte Kraft, Museum Küppersmühle für Moderne Kunst, Duisburg

Awards 
 1972:

References

Further reading 
 Götz Adriani (ed.): Klaus Rinke, Zeit Time, Raum Space, Körper Body, Handlungen Transformations. Catalogue publication Kunsthalle Tübingen, Cologne 1972
 Bernd Fäthke, Klaus Rinke and David Rabinowitch, Ausst. Kat.: 9. Aktion im „Raum 27“, Museum Wiesbaden, 30 Sep – 4 October 1975
 Bernd Fäthke, Rinkes Klasse im „Raum 27“, Ausst. Kat.: 10. Aktion im „Raum 27“, Letztes Mal hast du doch gesagt, daß du keine Kunst machst, Museum Wiesbaden, 21 – 28 March 1976
 Ursula Eisenbach, Hans-Werner Schmidt (ed.): Klaus Rinke, retroaktiv (1954–1991), Richter Verlag, Düsseldorf 1992
 Ursula Eisenbach (ed.): Klaus Rinke gemacht gedacht. Texte & Interviews, Grupello, Düsseldorf 2004  
 Hannelore Kersting (ed.): Kunst der Gegenwart. 1960 bis 2007. Städtisches Museum Abteiberg Mönchengladbach, 2007,

External links 
 
 Klaus Rinke on documenta Archiv
 Meisterwerke. Klaus Rinke "Zeitfeld", WDR-Sendung von Martina Müller, 15 January 2013

Academic staff of Kunstakademie Düsseldorf
German contemporary artists
1939 births
Living people
People from Bochum